Border Beacon (Mid-Canada Line Site 212) was a United States Air Force military installation in Labrador, located approximately 190 km west of the Town of Hopedale. Border Beacon was a bistatic radar Doppler Detection Station on the Mid-Canada Line system of early-warning radar stations.

Opened in 1957, and fully operational in 1958, Border Beacon was in operation for eight years. The eastern portion of the Mid-Canada Line was shut down in 1965 and the site was closed.

Transport Canada
The Government of Canada took possession of the Border Beacon site from the US in 1965 and transformed it into a weather station. Transport Canada operated the weather station until it closed in the 1970s.

Accidents and incidents
On 10 January 1986, a de Havilland Canada DHC-2 Beaver (C-GUBD) of Goose Bay Air Services departed CFB Goose Bay and crashed at Border Beacon due to unknown circumstances.

References

Royal Canadian Air Force
Radar networks
Meteorological stations
Cold War military history of Canada
Border Beacon
Radar stations of the United States Air Force
Installations of the United States Air Force in Canada
Military installations in Newfoundland and Labrador
Military installations closed in 1965
Military installations established in 1957
1957 establishments in Newfoundland and Labrador
1965 disestablishments in Newfoundland and Labrador
Defunct airports in Newfoundland and Labrador